Thenus orientalis is a species of slipper lobster from the Indian and Pacific oceans.

T. orientalis is known by a number of common names. The United Nations Food and Agriculture Organization prefers the name flathead lobster, while the official Australian name is Bay lobster. In Australia, it is more widely known as the Moreton Bay bug after Moreton Bay, near Brisbane, Queensland. In Singapore, both the flathead lobster and true crayfish are called crayfish. They are used in many Singaporean dishes. The species is sometimes confused with the Balmain bug (Ibacus peronii) but it can be distinguished by the placement of the eyes: the eyes of I. peronii are near the midline, while those of T. orientalis are at the margin of the carapace.

Thenus orientalis has an Indo-West Pacific distribution, ranging from the east coast of Africa (southern Red Sea, to Natal) to China including the Persian Gulf, southern Japan, the Philippines and along the northern coast of Australia from Western Australia to Queensland. They are also caught on a small scale off the shores of Malaysia and Singapore.

References

External links
 

Achelata
Edible crustaceans
Australian cuisine
Monotypic arthropod genera